Complications is the eighth and final studio album by Spanish rock band Dover, produced by Jesús Antúnez and published by Sony Music Spain on 9 February 2015.

After a record break of five years since I Ka Kené, published in 2010, the Madrid band released a new album that left aside the electronic sound of their previous two albums to return to their rock roots. As pointed out by their label, Sony Music, it is a total of ten songs "inspired by their favorite bands ever, but with tons of charisma." The album features heavy use of autotune and religious references in songs like "Sisters Of Mercy" which may be a callback to the album Devil Came To Me but with a different perspective than what was on that album.

Track listing

Personnel
 Cristina Llanos – Vocals and acoustic guitar
 Amparo Llanos – Guitar
 Samuel Titos – Bass guitar
 Jesús Antúnez – Drums

Charts

References

External links 
 

2015 albums
Dover (band) albums